Wendouree railway station is located on the Serviceton line in Victoria, Australia. It serves the north-western Ballarat suburb of Wendouree, and it opened on 12 June 2009.

History

20th century

The original Wendouree station opened on 9 December 1901 as Ballarat Gardens, and was renamed Wendouree on 1 August 1905. It was located just west of the Forest Street level crossing, 750 metres east of the present station, and was closed to passenger traffic on 4 October 1981, as part of the New Deal for Country Passengers timetable. Prior to its closure, the only regular train to stop at Wendouree was a Horsham service on Sundays.

In 1992, boom barriers replaced interlocked gates at the Gillies Street level crossing, located in the Up direction of the present station.

At Gillies Street, near the site of the current station, stood a 19th-century signal box, which controlled the Ballarat Cattle Yards junction. After falling into disrepair, the Public Transport Corporation was approached by Kim Lynden, who later successfully tendered to move the building to Blampied, becoming a bed and breakfast in 1998.

21st century
On 8 September 2006, then Victorian Premier Steve Bracks announced a new station would be built to relieve congestion at Ballarat, following a passenger boom after the completion of the Regional Fast Rail project.

The station was the subject of a naming competition, which closed in April 2007. In May 2008, construction work started, with the station originally due for completion in that year.

On 11 June 2009, the station was opened by the former Minister for Public Transport Lynne Kosky, with services commencing on 14 June of that year. The cost of the station and associated works was initially projected to be $11 million, but eventually costed $18.7 million.

In 2019, as part of the Regional Rail Revival project, a second platform was built opposite Platform 1, with a footbridge, lifts, ramps and stairs connecting the platforms, as well as an upgrade to the station forecourt. A refuge siding was also constructed, to allow trains to arrive into Platform 2.

Platforms and services

Wendouree has two side platforms. It is serviced by V/Line Ballarat and Ararat line services.

Platform 1:
  terminating services; services to Southern Cross
  services to Ararat and Southern Cross

Platform 2:
  terminating services; services to Southern Cross

Transport links

CDC Ballarat operates four routes via Wendouree station, under contract to Public Transport Victoria:
 : Ballarat station – Alfredton
 : to Ballarat station
 : to Ballarat station
 : to Miners Rest

Gallery

References

External links

 Rail Geelong gallery
 Melway map at street-directory.com.au

Railway stations in Australia opened in 2009
Regional railway stations in Victoria (Australia)
Transport in Ballarat
Buildings and structures in Ballarat